Foundation: Doc Watson Guitar Instrumental Collection, 1964-1998 (or simply Foundation) is the title of a recording by American folk music and country blues artist Doc Watson, released in 2000. It contains instrumental tracks from Watson's 1964 to 1998 recordings.

Track listing
 "Black Mountain Rag" (Traditional) – 1:31
 "Windy & Warm" (John D. Loudermilk) – 2:15
 "June Apple" (Traditional) – 2:11
 "Doc's Guitar" (Watson) – 1:30
 "Stone's Rag" (Traditional) – 2:40
 "Victory Rag" (Maybelle Carter) – 1:45
 "Nashville Pickin'" (John Pilla, Doc Watson) – 1:53
 "Medley: Fiddler's Dream/Whistling Rufus/Ragtime Annie (Raggedy Ann)" (Traditional) – 2:11
 "Billy in the Low Ground" (Traditional) – 1:47
 "Rainbow" (Traditional) – 2:33
 "Dill Pickle Rag" (Traditional) – 1:25
 "Salt River/Bill Cheatham" (Traditional) – 2:28
 "Lonesome Banjo" (Watson) – 1:43
 "Texas Gales" (Molly O' Day) – 1:31
 "Tucker's Barn" (Traditional) – 2:18
 "Cannonball Rag" (Merle Travis) – 2:03

Personnel
Doc Watson – guitar, harmonica, vocals
Merle Watson – guitar, banjo
Production notes: Re-issue
Jim Mills – compilation producer
Dan Crary – liner notes
David Glasser – mastering
Will McIntyre – photography
Sue Meyer – design
D. Kent Thompson – photography

References

2000 compilation albums
Doc Watson compilation albums
Sugar Hill Records compilation albums